Paul Ulenbelt (born 1 April 1952 in Haaksbergen) is a Dutch politician and former trade unionist and academic. As a member of the Socialist Party (Socialistische Partij) he was an MP between 30 November 2006 and 23 March 2017. He focused on matters of pensions, income and employment.

Ulenbelt studied industrial and organizational psychology at the University of Groningen and got promoted in medicine at the University of Amsterdam.

References 

1952 births
Living people
Dutch academics
Dutch psychologists
Dutch trade unionists
Members of the House of Representatives (Netherlands)
People from Haaksbergen
Socialist Party (Netherlands) politicians
University of Amsterdam alumni
University of Groningen alumni
21st-century Dutch politicians